María Belén Rodríguez Cozzani (born 20 September 1984), better known as Belén Rodríguez or Belén, is an Argentine television personality, actress and model. Based in Milan since 2004, Rodríguez has hosted variety shows and appeared in television commercials and films.

Biography

Early life 
Rodríguez was born on 20 September 1984 in Buenos Aires, Argentina to Gustavo Rodríguez and Veronica Cozzani de Rodríguez. Veronica, of Italian origin, is the daughter of immigrants from La Spezia in Liguria. Rodríguez has a younger brother, Jeremías, in addition to her younger sister Cecilia. At age 10, she moved to Pilar with her family. Rodríguez' sister, Cecilia (born on 18 March 1990 in Pilar, Argentina), has been a model in Italy since 2008. In January 2014, Cecilia became Belén's business partner. Jeremías, Gustavo and Veronica have lived in Milan since August 2015, and Jeremías (born on 11 November 1988 in Pilar) has been active in Italian show business since 2017.

Personal life 
From August 2004 to December 2008, Rodríguez was the girlfriend of A.C. Milan footballer Marco Borriello. From January 2009 to April 2012, she was in a relationship with Fabrizio Corona; they broke up when she met dancer Stefano De Martino, whom she married. They had a son named Santiago on 9 April 2013 in Milan, and married on 20 September of that year. Rodríguez and De Martino separated on 22 December 2015, and divorced on 24 January 2017 after signing a judicial agreement at the Court of Milan; as part of the divorzio breve (fast-track divorce), De Martino was ordered to pay €1,000 per month in child support. Their divorce became final six months later. To avoid a lengthy public trial, De Martino did not request alimony. Santiago lives with Rodríguez. From September 2020 to January 2022 Rodríguez had a relationship with the hair-stylist Antonino Spinalbese: on 12 July 2021 their daughter, named Luna Marì Spinalbese, was born.

Career 
She has lived in Italy since 2004, hosting variety shows and appearing in films and television commercials and programs. Considered a sex symbol of the 2000s and 2010s, Rodríguez posed in Italy for Playboy and several nude calendars. The tabloid press in Italy and abroad have closely followed her life and career.

The international press called Rodríguez "the Rioplatense Sophia Loren" and "the Italian Sara Carbonero". In February 2011 she hosted the Sanremo Music Festival, the festival's third Argentine host (after Valeria Mazza and Lola Ponce). Rodríguez has worked with Gerry Scotti, Maria De Filippi, Paolo Bonolis, Michelle Hunziker and Gianni Morandi.

Singing 
Rodríguez appeared with Claudia Galanti in the Boyfriend video clip for Coolio's 2008 Steal Hear album.

During 2009, Rodríguez made her vocal debut with "Dai muovi muovi" by Mario Gardini, Giovanni Paolo Fontana and Roberto De Luca (the theme song of Sarabanda, hosted by the singer on Canale 5). The following February she sang Toto Cutugno's "" at the Teatro Ariston, which she also sang at the 2010 Sanremo Festival with Cutugno. Rodríguez (using the stage name Maria Belén) sang "Amarti è folle", written and arranged by Fortunato Zampaglione for the film Non c'è due senza te, at the Sanremo Music Festival 2015.

Acting 
She made her acting debut during 2010 in the cinepanettone Natale in Sudafrica, directed by Neri Parenti and released on 17 December of that year. Rodríguez appeared in Se sei così, ti dico sì (directed by Eugenio Cappuccio and released on 15 April 2011) and the episode "Il campo del vasaio" of the Rai 1 television series Il commissario Montalbano, which premiered on 14 March 2011. Rodríguez guest starred in several episodes of the second season of Così fan tutte, an Italia 1 sitcom directed by Gianluca Fumagalli, in 2011–2012. She dubbed her voice in the animated film Gladiatori di Roma, directed by Iginio Straffi and released on 18 October 2012. During 2014 Rodríguez appeared in Non c'è 2 senza te, directed by Massimo Cappelli and released on 5 February 2015. In August 2015 Lux Vide and RAI Fiction announced that she would guest-star in "", a tenth-season episode of the Rai 1 TV series Don Matteo which premiered on 7 January 2016.

Business 
Rodríguez introduced two perfumes in 2011: Belén Rodríguez (Gold) and Belén Rodríguez (Eau de Parfum). In January 2014 the Italian weekly magazine Il Mondo reported that she and Cecilia were founding the Family Factor, a company to oversee their family's Italian business activities. Arnoldo Mondadori Editore published Bella Belén, a photo-book, in early 2014. In June 2015 Rodríguez opened Ricci, a restaurant in Milan, with three partners. Around that time she opened beauty salons for Cotril, an Italian company in which she is a spokesperson and business partner. In December 2017, Ricci was closed and sold.

Modelling 
In 2007, Rodríguez appeared with Elisabetta Canalis and Christian De Sica in the Telecom Italia (TIM) commercials as Donna dei Sogni (Dream Woman). Her collaboration with TIM continued until February 2011.

In February 2012, Rodríguez posed nude for the cover of the Italian edition of Vanity Fair. In July 2012 She also posed nude for the cover of the Italian edition of GQ, photographed by Douglas Kirkland. In May 2013, Rodríguez and Gerry Scotti became spokespeople for the "marriage" of Barilla and McDonald's. She debuted as a stylist for the Imperfect clothing line with Fabio Castelli. In June 2013, Rodríguez became spokesperson for the Bikini Lovers cruise-wear line created by fashion blogger Chiara Biasi. In October 2013, she and Cecilia presented the 2013–2014 Imperfect fashion line as models and stylists. In December, Rodríguez was the spokesperson for Javier Zanetti's Pupi Foundation and (with her husband, Stefano De Martino) for virtual application software created by WeChat.

As models and designers, in February 2014 Rodríguez and Cecilia presented Imperfect's third fashion line. That year, she posed for the cover of SportWeek. Rodríguez and Cecilia designed and produced Me Fui, a new beachwear line for 2014, and Belén became the spokesperson for Samsung mobile phones. During 2014, she was model and spokesperson (with Stefano De Martino) for Richmond Perfumes. In January 2015, John Richmond replaced Rodríguez with Venezuelan model Mariana Rodríguez for the Milan fashion shows. In September 2016, she lost the Vanitas line to Madalina Ghenea.

During 2005, Rodríguez first posed nude for the Vuemme Calendar 2006. She posed nude with three other models (Eva Collini, Ainett Stephens and Nena Ristić) for the De Nardi Calendar 2006. In 2006, Rodríguez posed nude for the Fer Calendar 2007. During 2007 and 2008, she posed nude for Maxim Calendars. In 2009, Rodríguez and Cecilia (in her modelling debut) posed nude for the Max Calendar 2010. Between late 2009 and early 2010, Vuemme published Calendar Vuemme 2010 (a reprint of the 2006 one). In 2010, Rodríguez posed for the Maxim and TIM calendars (her last calendars).

On 18 February 2009 Rodríguez said in a Corriere della Sera interview that several years earlier she declined an offer to pose nude for the cover of Playboy Miami, preferring to remain in Italy for a fashion shoot with an Emilian company. In early 2012, she became the face of the Arthur's Underwear lingerie line. Rodríguez, Alessandra Ambrosio and Shanina Shaik became the global spokespeople for Swarovski in August 2017.

During 2015, Paul Marciano chose Rodríguez as his flagship model and the worldwide spokesperson for Guess?. Marciano]] also used her for 2016 season and 2017. In 2016 In February 2017, Rodríguez posed for Jadea's spring–summer women's intimate and homewear collections. The following month, she endorsed the Foreyever eyeglass line. In July Rodríguez endorsed McDonald's]], and endorsed Alessandro Angelozzi Couture's 2018 line of wedding dresses in October. She modelled at the 2018 Milan Fashion Week, for the Swarovski line (with Alessandra Ambrosio and Shanina Shaik), for Jadea's new line and (with Cecilia) for Me Fui's spring–summer 2018 line.

From May to July 2018, Rodríguez modelled and endorsed for RaNpollo, Hanny Deep, Comme Des Fkdown, Gaëlle Paris, and Pyrex. She worked again with Guess? and model Stefano Sala in Cefalù, Sicily.

Television 

Rodríguez debuted on television in November 2006 on Tele Boario 1, Val Camonica's local television station. After signing with Paola Benegas, her first Italian agent in Italy, she debuted on Italian national television as co-host (with singer Taiyo Yamanouchi) of Rai 3's late-night comedy show La tintoria in 2007. That year, Rodríguez co-hosted the prime-time variety Circo Massimo Show with Fabrizio Frizzi. She appeared on 4 April 2008 episode (introducing 18-year-old Cecilia in her Italian television debut) of Rai 1's prime-time variety show I raccomandati, hosted by Carlo Conti and Alessia Ventura. That year, Rodríguez was a journalist and co-host (with Selvaggia Lucarelli), of Pirati, a late-night Rai 2 show. In 2008 Belén, after modelling for Max magazine several months earlier, Rodríguez appeared in the sixth season of L'isola dei famosi (a Rai 2 reality show hosted by Simona Ventura) and placed second.

In December 2008, she joined Lucio Presta's Arcobaleno Tre agency. During 2009, Rodríguez co-hosted (with Claudio Amendola and Teo Mammucari) the eleventh season of the prime-time variety show Scherzi a parte on Canale 5. From 2009 to 2011, she appeared in mobile-phone-network television commercials and modelled jewellery. During 2009 Rodríguez co-hosted (with Teo Mammucari) the Canale 5 quiz show Sarabanda, whose the theme song she recorded. She guest starred on 23 November episode of the 10th season of Italian Big Brother, a Canale 5 reality show hosted by Alessia Marcuzzi. In 2010, Rodríguez and Cecelia appeared on Italia 1's late-night Chiambretti Night variety show. She appeared on 18 February 2010 Sanremo Music Festival with singer Toto Cutugno.

In February 2011, Rodríguez co-hosted the Sanremo Music Festival 2011 with Gianni Morandi and Elisabetta Canalis. That year, she co-hosted Rai 1's Ciak ... si canta! with Francesco Facchinetti. Rodríguez appeared on Canale 5's variety show La notte degli chef, hosted by Alfonso Signorini. In 2011, she co-hosted the Italia 1 comedy show  with Paolo Ruffini, Digei Angelo and Chiara Francini. She co-hosted Colorado with Paolo Ruffini, Digei Angelo, Elena Morali and Jiang Wei. The following year, Rodríguez and Stefano de Martino appeared on Canale 5's prime-time Studio 5.

In February 2014, during the Sanremo Music Festival, she appeared on RTL 102.5's Password and guest-starred on Rai 1's Domenica In – Speciale Sanremo. That year, Rodríguez hosted Italia 1's afternoon  (the Italian version of Plain Jane) and guest-starred on Colorado. In May and June she danced on Italia 1's , a late-night talk show and hosted by Piero Chiambretti. On 8 February 2015, she co-hosted the Canale 5 quiz show   with Gerry Scotti.

She guest-starred on the 17th season of the talent show Amici di Maria De Filippi with Maradona in April 2018, and with Michelle Hunziker in May. During the 2018 FIFA World Cup, Rodríguez appeared on the sports talk show .

The international press has called Rodríguez "the Rioplatense Sophia Loren" and "the Italian Sara Carbonero". She hosted the February 2011 Sanremo Music Festival, the third Argentine (after Valeria Mazza and Lola Ponce). Cecilia Rodríguez, an Argentine show-woman active in Italy since 2008, is Belén's younger sister. She is considered a sex symbol of the 2000s and 2010s, and has posed for nude calendars.

Awards

Filmography

References

External links 

 
 
 

1984 births
Living people
Argentine actresses
Argentine female models
Argentine television personalities
Women television personalities
Association footballers' wives and girlfriends
Participants in Italian reality television series
Argentine people of Spanish descent
Argentine people of Italian descent
21st-century Argentine women